Akron Public Schools is a school district serving students in Akron, Ohio, United States, and nearby communities. The district encompasses  and includes, as of the 2017–2018 school year, 8 high schools, 8 middle schools, 33 elementary schools, and 3 administration buildings. Approximately 20,000 students are enrolled. The district employs 2800 full-time and 1700 part-time employees. The district's annual budget exceeds $559 million.

Community learning centers
Akron Public Schools is undergoing reconstruction of its buildings. Through a partnership with the city of Akron and OSFC, schools in the Akron Public Schools district will be rebuilt or remodeled to become community learning centers by the 2020–2021 school year. These are schools by day and community centers by night and weekends.

Twenty-nine "CLCs" are complete and another four are in the design or construction stage. The City of Akron is responsible for scheduling the use of these buildings after school hours.

Programs offered
Akron Early College High School - Students earn a high school diploma and an associate degree or up to 72 hours toward a bachelor's degree. 100% of the student body is dual enrolled at both AECHS and The University of Akron. The school serves students in grades 9 - 12. Students apply for admission in the eighth grade, and all students begin college coursework in the ninth grade. High school classrooms are located in three buildings on the campus of The University of Akron.

National Inventor's Hall of Fame STEM High School is Akron's newest school. It opened in Fall 2012 and houses 350 students in grades 9–12. The school continues the mission begun by the STEM middle school with hands-on learning emphasizing the use of technology and inquiry learning. The school is located in the former Central Hower High School across from the University of Akron with close ties to the university. Akron U has pledged millions of dollars in scholarships to be directed to Akron Public School graduates, particularly from the STEM program.

National Inventor's Hall of Fame STEM Middle School opened in fall 2009 and houses grades 5–8. The school specializes in hands on learning and emphasizes the use of technology and inquiry learning and will serve as a pilot for teaching practices to be used at the district's other schools.

International Baccalaureate — the IB program at Firestone High School is a rigorous two-year curriculum beginning in the 11th grade meant to help students become internationally minded learners.

College and Career Academies — students choose a career pathway at the end of their freshman year of high school. From there they learn about their pathway as they continue high school. They have the ability to obtain occupational training that meets industry standards. Many graduates will have a credential and be ready for college or jobs.

Visual & Performing Arts — nearly 700 students participate in visual and performing arts programs at Miller South School for the Visual and Performing Arts (grades 4–8) and Firestone High School. Firestone students can earn an arts endorsement on their diploma and transcript. Students perform at concerts and dance recitals and in music and theatre programs.

College credit plus — Students can earn a high school diploma and college credit through this program. Students can begin taking college classes, if eligible, in eighth grade. High school students can earn a diploma while earning up to 64 college credit hours at the University of Akron.

Schools

High schools
 Akron Early College High School
 Buchtel Community Learning Center
 East Community Learning Center
 Ellet Community Learning Center
 Firestone Community Learning Center (Akron School for the Arts)
 Kenmore-Garfield High School 
 National Inventors Hall of Fame STEM High School
 North High School

The Akron school board voted in October 2016 to build a new high school that will consolidate both Garfield and Kenmore high schools. The schools will merge and be housed at the Kenmore location for the 2017–2018 school year as "Kenmore-Garfield" while the new building is constructed on the Garfield site. The new building is expected to open in 2022 and will be called the "Garfield Community Learning Center".

Middle schools

 Bridges
 Buchtel CLC 7-8 Campus
 East CLC 7-8 Campus
 Hyre CLC
 Innes CLC
 Jennings CLC
 Litchfield CLC (Precursor to the Akron School for the Arts)
 Miller South School for the Visual and Performing Arts (Precursor to the Akron School for the Arts)
 National Inventors Hall of Fame STEM Middle School

Elementary schools
 Arnold CLC
 Barber CLC
 Betty Jane CLC
 Bridges
 Case CLC
 Crouse CLC
 Findley CLC
 Firestone Park
 Forest Hill CLC
 Glover CLC
 Harris-Jackson CLC
 Hatton CLC
 Hill CLC
 King CLC
 Leggett CLC
 Mason CLC
 McEbright CLC
 Pfeiffer
 Portage Path CLC
 Resnik CLC (formerly Fairlawn Reserve Elementary) 
 Rimer CLC
 Ritzman CLC
 Robinson CLC
 Sam Salem CLC
 Schumacher CLC
 Seiberling CLC
 Voris CLC
 Windemere CLC

Specialty schools
 Adult Learning
 Akron Alternative Academy
 Akron Digital Academy-No longer affiliated with Akron Public Schools
 Akron Early College High School
 Akron Opportunity Center
Akron Preparatory School-Not an Akron Public School {Ican Network}
Akron School for the Arts (Firestone CLC) 
 Bridges
 Evening High School
 Miller South School for the Visual and Performing Arts
 National Inventors Hall of Fame STEM Middle School
 Olympus
 School of Practical Nursing (Closed June 2018)
 I Promise School 
(Specialty School for At-Risk students.)

Schools that have been closed

High schools 
 Central High School - built in 1884 - sat on the current site of Central-Hower High School until it was demolished and replaced in 1973. It was known as Akron High School until South was built in 1911, then it was renamed Central.
 Central-Hower High School (123 S. Forge St.) was closed at the end of the 2005–2006 school year. It is currently being used for the National Inventors Hall of Fame STEM High School.
 Garfield High School - built in 1936 - housed at 435 N Firestone Blvd - closed at the end of the 2016–2017 school year and merged with Kenmore as Kenmore-Garfield High School.
 Hower Vocational High School (130 W. Exchange St.) - named for M. Otis Hower (1858-1916), an Akron manufacturing leader. APS opened trade classes in Perkins Elementary in 1927 and renamed the building for Hower. It housed the Central-Hower student body after their merger in 1975 until the new building was completed, it was then demolished in 1978.
 Kenmore High School - built in 1918 - housed at 2140 13th St. SW - closed at the end of the 2016-2017 school and merged with Garfield as Kenmore-Garfield High School.
 South High School (1055 East Ave.) closed at the end of the 1979–1980 school year. It reopened in 1994 as an intermediate visual and performing arts school, renamed George C. Miller South School for the Visual and Performing Arts.
 West High School (315 S. Maple St.) was built in 1914 and closed around 1953 to be reopened as West Jr. High School. The building closed in 1980 and became Senior Citizen Apartments.

Middle schools 
 Goodrich Middle School closed at the end of the 2008–2009 school year.
Goodyear Middle School closed in 2012 and was combined with the former East High School once construction of East CLC was completed. 
Perkins Technology Middle School, Three buildings were constructed (1872, 1920, 1954). The second one was renamed Hower Vocational School. The original building was torn down in 1949. It closed after housing Litchfield Middle School during construction after the spring of 2016.
Roswell Kent Middle School closed in spring 2017.
Riedinger Middle School closed at the end of the 2008–2009 school year and became the Akron Opportunity Center 
Thornton Junior High School opened in 1955 at the former South High School after a new South High School was built. Thornton closed in 1979 and the building was later demolished.
West Jr. High School opened around 1953 in the former West HS. It closed in 1980 and later became senior citizen living apartments.

Elementary schools 
Allen Elementary School closed in 1967 and was demolished. 
Barret Elementary School closed at the end of the 2011–2012 school year. The building is now occupied by Bridges Learning Center 
Bettes Elementary School closed in spring 2017.
Bryan Elementary School closed in 1978. It became Glenwood Jail, which also houses drug and alcohol rehabilitation services through Oriana House.
Colonial Elementary School closed in 1964 and became part of the Sheet Metal Worker's Union for a number of years. It reopened in August 2013 as Colonial Preparatory Academy, a charter school serving students in Kenmore and West Akron.
Crosby closed in 2004 and was used as the Akron Alternative School until it was demolished.
Fairlawn Elementary School was demolished in 2006 and replaced by Judith Resnik Community Learning Center.
Erie Island Elementary Schools closed at the end of the 2008–09 school year. The Akron School of Practical Nursing was moved into the building in 2009.
Essex Elementary school Closed 2011-12 School year 
Fraunfelter Elementary School closed in 1980 and now houses Oriana House Administrative Offices.
Grace Elementary School became an antiques mall for a few years, now demolished. The land now houses a car dealership.
Guinther Elementary School closed in 1993 and was later demolished.
Heminger Elementary closed in 2008.
Henry Elementary School on North Forge Street closed in 1978. The building was used as a daycare center for children of Summa Akron City Hospital employees until its demolition in 2007. The land now houses additions made to Summa Akron City Hospital in 2008.
Howe Elementary School closed in 1972 and was later demolished. The land that formerly housed the school was used in building the Akron Innerbelt.
Lane Elementary was demolished in 1980. Helen Arnold Community Learning Center, which opened in the fall of 2007, was built near the former school to serve students in the neighborhood.
Lincoln Elementary School closed at the end of the 2008–09 school year.
Lawndale Elementary School closed at the end of the 2015–16 school year.
Margaret Park Elementary closed in 2007. Demolished in 2017.
Miller Elementary School closed in 1978 and became administrative offices for Akron Public Schools.
Rankin Elementary closed after the 2011–2012 school year
Smith Elementary School closed at the end of the 2015–16 school year.
Spicer Elementary School, located at 332 Carroll Street, closed in 1968 and became Spicer Hall at the University of Akron. The building was demolished in 1999.
Stewart Elementary School closed at the end of the 2008–09 school year.
Thomastown Elementary School now houses the Haunted Schoolhouse.

References

External links
APS website

School districts in Summit County, Ohio
Education in Akron, Ohio
School districts established in 1847